Luke Johnson is an American game designer who has worked primarily on role-playing games.

Career
Luke Johnson designed Temple of Blood (2007), the first adventure in the "Wicked Fantasy Factory" series of adventures from Goodman Games'; Temple of Blood was one of the company's three offerings at the inaugural Free RPG Day.

His D&D design work includes Player's Guide to Eberron (2006),  Player's Handbook II (2006), Monster Manual V (2007), Eberron Player's Guide (2009), and The Plane Below (2009).

References

External links
 

American game designers
Dungeons & Dragons game designers
Living people
Place of birth missing (living people)
Year of birth missing (living people)